The 2018–19 North Carolina Tar Heels men's basketball team  represented the University of North Carolina at Chapel Hill during the 2018–19 NCAA Division I men's basketball season. The team's head coach was Roy Williams, who was in his 16th season as UNC's head men's basketball coach. The Tar Heels played their home games at the Dean Smith Center in Chapel Hill, North Carolina as members of the Atlantic Coast Conference. They finished the season 29–7, 16–2 in ACC play to finish tied for the regular season conference championship with Virginia. As the No. 2 seed in the ACC tournament, they advanced to the semifinals before ultimately losing to Duke. They received an at-large bid to the NCAA tournament as the No. 1 seed in the Midwest region, where they advanced to the Sweet Sixteen before losing to Auburn.

Previous season

The Tar Heels finished the 2017–18 season with a record of 26–11, 11–7 in ACC play to finish in a four-way tie for third place. As the No. 6 seed in the ACC tournament, they defeated Syracuse, Miami, and Duke before losing to Virginia in the championship game. They received an at-large bid to the NCAA tournament as the No. 2 seed in the West region where they defeated Lipscomb before losing to Texas A&M in the second round.

Offseason

Departures

2018 recruiting class

Roster

Schedule and results

|-
!colspan=12 style=|Exhibition

|-
!colspan=12 style=|Non-conference regular season

|-
!colspan=12 style=|ACC Regular Season

|-
!colspan=12 style=|ACC Tournament

|-
!colspan=12 style=| NCAA tournament

Source

Rankings

*AP does not release post-NCAA Tournament rankings^Coaches did not release a Week 2 poll.

References

North Carolina Tar Heels men's basketball seasons
North Carolina
Tar
North Carolina